Pulicicochlea is a genus of very small ectoparasitic sea snails, marine gastropod mollusks or micromollusks in the family Eulimidae.

Distribution
This marine genus occurs in the Western Pacific and off Australia (Queensland).

Species
Species within the genera Pulicicochlea include:
 Pulicicochlea astropyga Ponder & Gooding, 1978
 Pulicicochlea calamaris Ponder & Gooding, 1978
 Pulicicochlea faba Ponder & Gooding, 1978
 Pulicicochlea fusca Ponder & Gooding, 1978

References

 Ponder, W.F. & Gooding, R.U. 1978. Four new eulimid gastropods associated with shallow-water diadematid echinoids in the western Pacific. Pacific Science 32(2): 157-181 
 Warén A. (1984) A generic revision of the family Eulimidae (Gastropoda, Prosobranchia). Journal of Molluscan Studies suppl. 13: 1-96.

Eulimidae